The 2016–17 CEV Challenge Cup was the 37th edition of the CEV Challenge Cup tournament, the former CEV Cup.

Russian club Fakel Novy Urengoy beat French team Chaumont VB 52 in both final meetings and achieved first CEV Challenge Cup.

Participating teams

Qualification phase

2nd round
1st leg 8–9 November 2016
2nd leg 22–24 November 2016

|}

Main phase

16th finals
1st leg 6–14 December 2016
2nd leg 20–22 December 2016

|}

8th finals
1st leg 17–19 January 2017
2nd leg 31 January  – 2 February 2017

|}

4th finals
1st leg 14–16 February 2017
2nd leg 28 February – 1 March 2017

|}

Final phase

Semi-finals

|}

First leg

|}

Second leg

|}

Final

First leg

|}

Second leg

|}

Final standing

References

External links
 Official site

CEV Challenge Cup
2016 in volleyball
2017 in men's volleyball